This was the first edition of the tournament, primarily created due to the one-week delay of the 2021 French Open.

Simone Bolelli and Máximo González won the title, defeating Oliver Marach and Aisam-ul-Haq Qureshi in the final, 6–3, 6–3.

Seeds

Draw

Draw

References

External Links
Main Draw

Emilia-Romagna Open - Doubles
Emilia-Romagna Open